White lion is a colour mutation of the lion

White Lion may also refer to:

White Lion, a Danish/American rock band.
White Lion Records, Puerto Rico
White Lion, Barthomley, a pub in Cheshire, England
White Lion, Covent Garden, a pub in London, England
The White Lion, Putney, a pub in London, England
The White Lion, St Albans, a pub in Hertfordshire, England
The White Lion, Thornbury, a pub in Gloucestershire, England
White Lion (film), a 2010 South African film directed by Michael Swan
"White Lion" (Voltron: Legendary Defender)
The White Lion, a privateer ship that sold the first Africans in English America

See also
The White Lions, a 1981 American film
Old White Lion, Bury, a pub in Greater Manchester, England
Order of the White Lion, the highest order awarded by the Czech Republic
White Lion Society, a British heraldry organisation
Kimba The White Lion